The Don't Call It a Sum-Back Tour is the ninth headlining concert tour by Canadian band, Sum 41. The tour was launched to support the band's sixth studio album, 13 Voices (2016). Beginning October 2016, the tour played nearly 100 shows in the Americas, Europe and Asia.

Background
Approaching the end of their run on the Warped Tour, the tour was announced in last August. During breaks in their schedule, the band toured alongside Papa Roach and Pierce the Veil.

Opening acts
Senses Fail 
As It Is 
Paerish 
Hollerado 
The Living End 
Trash Boat 
Itchy

Setlist
The following setlist was obtained from the concert held on February 18, 2017, at the Palladium in Cologne, Germany. It does not represent all concerts for the duration of the tour. 
"Instrumental Sequence"
"A Murder of Crows"
"Fake My Own Death"
"The Hell Song"
"Over My Head (Better Off Dead)"
"Goddamn I'm Dead Again"
"Underclass Hero"
"Screaming Bloody Murder"
"There Will Be Blood"
"War"
"Motivation" 
"Instrumental Sequence"
"Grab the Devil by the Horns and Fuck Him Up the Ass"
"We're All to Blame"
"Walking Disaster"
"Makes No Difference"
"With Me"
"God Save Us All (Death to Pop)"
"Instrumental Sequence"
"No Reason"
"We Will Rock You"
"Still Waiting"
"In Too Deep"
Encore
"Crash"
"Pieces"
"Welcome to Hell"
"Fat Lip"
"Pain for Pleasure"

Tour dates

Festivals and other miscellaneous performances

This concert was a part of "Vivo x el Rock"
This concert was a part of the "Sabroso Craft Beer, Taco & Music Festival"
This concert was a part of "Rock im Park"
This concert was a part of "Rock am Ring"
This concert was a part of "Le Jardin du Michel"
This concert was a part of the "Pinkpop Festival"
This concert was a part of the "Caribana Festival"
This concert was a part of the "Greenfield Festival"
This concert was a part of the "Download Festival"
This concert was a part of the "Independent Days Festival"
This concert was a part of the "Graspop Metal Meeting"
This concert was a part of "Empire Rockfest"
This concert was a part of "Les Grandes Fêtes Telus"
This concert was a part of the "Festival des Bières du Monde de Saguenay"
This concert was a part of "Osisko en lumière"
This concert was a part of the "Summer Sonic Festival"
This concert was a part of "FireBall Fest"

Cancellations and rescheduled shows

Box office score data

References

2016 concert tours
2017 concert tours
Sum 41